Valdomiro Castilho de Lima (January 15, 1873 – 1938) was a Brazilian soldier and politician.

Biography
He was born in Rio Grande do Sul. He began his military career in the regiment of border Garrison of missions, in 1890, later went to School shooting and tactics of Rio Pardo. He participated in the Federalist Revolution of 1893 alongside loyalist forces and in 1898 joined the military school of Red Beach, in Rio de Janeiro.

In 1904, he was elected State representative for Rio Grande do Sul and reelected consecutively until 1913. After its passage by the Legislative Council, returned to the army. In 1920, he enrolled in the school of staff of the Army.

Taking command of the 3rd Infantry Regiment, on red Beach, arrived to quell the first tenentistas of the 1920 uprisings, however, became sympathetic to the cause, being reformed and arrested, remaining in this position from 1923 to 1925. In 1929, joined the Liberal Alliance.
In the Brazilian Revolution of 1930, he held a command post in the revolutionary troops who invaded the headquarters of the 3rd military region, in Porto Alegre, in addition to heading a column of 4000 welder out of Rio Grande do Sul and reached the Paraná. For his services, was re-incorporated under Delaware General Corporation law to active duty in the army with the rank of general of Division.
In 1932, he fought the paulistas in the Constitutionalist Revolution. With the victory, he was appointed, by Getulio Vargas, federal intervenor in the State of São Paulo, while in Office from October 1932 to 6 27 July 1933. In this period, accumulated the post of Commander of the second military region.

In 1935, he participated in a group of observers sent by Brazil to the Second Italo-Ethiopian War, where he was delighted with the CV-33 Italian tankettes, for which reason Brazil acquired several dozens of them. In 1936 assumed command of the 1st military region but was removed from this post in June 1937, by political divergence with general Góes Monteiro. He died in Petropolis.

See also
Politics of Brazil

References

1873 births
1938 deaths